Llantwit may refer to:

 Llantwit - suburb of Neath, Neath Port Talbot, Wales
 Llantwit Major - coastal village in the Vale of Glamorgan, Wales
 Llantwit Fardre - village between Pontypridd and Bridgend, Rhondda Cynon Taf, Wales